The Herb Brooks Coach of the Year is an annual award given out at the conclusion of the National Collegiate Hockey Conference regular season to the best coach in the conference as voted by the coaches of each NCHC team.

The Coach of the Year was first awarded in 2014 and is a successor to the CCHA Coach of the Year which was discontinued after the conference dissolved due to the 2013–14 NCAA conference realignment.

It is named in honor of Herb Brooks who, though having died ten years prior to the NCHC beginning play, coached founding member St. Cloud State for one season. He is more famously known for coaching Minnesota to their first three national championships in the 1970s as well as leading Team USA to the 1980 gold medal.

A Herb Brooks Award is given out annually by the Minnesota State High School League.

Award winners

Winners by school

See also
NCHC Awards
CCHA Coach of the Year

References

External links

National Collegiate Hockey Conference
College ice hockey trophies and awards in the United States
College ice hockey coach of the year awards in the United States